Sir John Woodcock  (14 January 1932 – 21 September 2012) was Chief Inspector of Constabulary from January 1990 to July 1993.

Woodcock joined the Lancashire Constabulary as a Police cadet in 1947. Between 1950 and 1952 he served in the Special Investigation Branch of the Royal Military Police during the Korean War.
He rejoined the Lancashire Constabulary after the war as a Constable rising to the rank of Chief Inspector by 1965.

In 1965, he transferred to the Bedfordshire and Luton Constabulary and was promoted to Superintendent and then Chief Superintendent.

In 1968 he transferred to Gwent Constabulary and was promoted to Assistant Chief Constable and then in 1970 to Deputy Chief Constable.

Woodcock then served as Deputy Chief Constable of Devon and Cornwall Constabulary from 1974 to 1978.

After this he was promoted Chief Constable of North Yorkshire Police, holding the post for one year. Then he was appointed Chief Constable of South Wales Constabulary from 1979 to 1983. Whereafter he became HM Inspector of Constabulary for Wales and the Midlands until 1990.

In 1990, he was appointed Chief Inspector of Constabulary, a post he held for three years, before retiring in 1993.

Awards
He was awarded the Queen's Police Medal in 1976. He was appointed a Commander of the Order of the British Empire in 1983, and was knighted in 1989.

100px 

border|100px

References

British Chief Constables
People from Preston, Lancashire
1932 births
2012 deaths
Devon and Cornwall Police recipients of the Queen's Police Medal
English recipients of the Queen's Police Medal
Commanders of the Order of the British Empire
Knights Bachelor
Chief Inspectors of Constabulary (England and Wales)
Commanders of the Order of St John
Royal Military Police soldiers
British Army personnel of the Korean War